The following is a list of notable deaths in June 1966.

Entries for each day are listed alphabetically by surname. A typical entry lists information in the following sequence:
 Name, age, country of citizenship at birth, subsequent country of citizenship (if applicable), reason for notability, cause of death (if known), and reference.

June 1966

1 
 Herbert Bowmer, English cricketer (b. 1891)
 Cécile Butticaz, Swiss engineer (b. 1884)
 Dick Cox, American baseball player (b. 1897)
 Peter George, British author (b. 1924)
 Don Herold, American illustrator (b. 1889)
 Papa Jack Laine, American jazz musician (b. 1873)

2 
 François Ayoub, Syrian Archbishop of Aleppo and Cyprus (b. 1899)
 Arthur P. Bedou, American photographer (b. 1882)
 Joe Casey, American baseball player (b. 1887)
 Évariste Kimba, Congolese politician, Prime Minister of Congo (later Zaire), executed (b. 1926)
 Stephen King-Hall, Baron King-Hall, British politician, writer, and nobleman, MP (b. 1893)

3 
 Connie Brown, Canadian hockey player (b. 1917)
 Alice Calhoun, American actress (b. 1900)
 Dario Canas, Portuguese sports shooter, Olympic competitor at 1920 Summer Olympics and 1924 Summer Olympics (b. 1884)
 Reuben Swinburne Clymer, American occultist (b. 1878)
 Stuart Levy, British film producer (b. 1907)
 Fionán Lynch, British and Irish politician, MP, TD, Irish Minister for Education and for Fisheries (b. 1889)

4 
 Chang Myon, South Korean statesman, Vice President, Prime Minister (b. 1899)
 Arthur C. Cope, American organic chemist (b. 1909)
 Teddy Davis, American boxer (b. 1923)
 Blanche Knopf, American publisher (b. 1894)
 Frances Gertrude Kumm, Australian philanthropist (b. 1886)

5 
 Edward Arthur Carr, British colonial administrator of Nigeria (b. 1903)
 Oakley G. Kelly, American aviator (b. 1891)
 Lee Choon Seng, Chinese-born Singaporean businessman (b. 1888)
 Alexander Brown Mackie, American academic (b. 1894)

6 
 Sir Elias Wynne Cemlyn-Jones, Welsh politician (b. 1888) 
 Ethel Clayton, American actress (b. 1882)
 Bernie Henderson, American baseball player (b. 1899)
 Edward Iwi, English lawyer (b. 1904)
 Wilhelm Jannasch, German clergyman and academic (b. 1888)
 Heinz Liepmann, German writer (b. 1905)
 Elizabeth Christ Trump, German–American businesswoman (b. 1880)

7 
 Jean Arp, Alsatian sculptor, painter, and poet (b. 1887)
 Norman Baillie-Stewart, British army officer known as "The Officer in the Tower" when he was imprisoned in the Tower of London for collaboration with Nazi Germany in World War II (b. 1909)
 John Adam Day, British politician (b. 1901)
 James Hickey, Irish politician, TD
 Otto Hoogesteyn, German-born Dutch swimmer, competed in the 1924 Summer Olympics (b. 1903)
 Otto Karhi, Finnish politician, MP (b. 1876)

8 
 Jim Dixon, American football player (b. 1904)
 Karl Hasselmann, German cinematographer (b. 1883)
 Anton Melik, Slovenian geographer (b. 1890)

9 
 Max Friz, German design engineer (b. 1883)
 Sherry Edmundson Fry, American sculptor (b. 1879)
 Tage von Gerber, Swedish genealogist (b. 1885) 
 Per Helmer, Norwegian businessman (b. 1897)
 St Barbe Holland, English clergyman, Anglican Bishop of Wellington New Zealand (b. 1882)

10 
 Joseph Biondo, Italian-born American organized crime figure (b. 1897)
 Felice Carena, Italian painter (b. 1879)
 Gunnar Ekstrand, Swedish diver, competed in the 1912 and 1920 Summer Olympics (b. 1892)
 Wally Fraser, Australian rules footballer (b. 1897)

11 
 Alfred Berger, Austrian pair skater, Olympic gold medalist in 1924 (b. 1894)
 Thomas Hardie Chalmers, American opera singer and actor (b. 1884)
 Rube Currie, American baseball player (b. 1898)
 Timothy Curtis, English cricketer (b. 1882)
 Jimmy Davies, American race car driver (b. 1929)
 Wallace Ford, English-born American actor (b. 1898)
 Stewart Judah, American illusionist (b. 1893)
 Kumazawa Hiromichi, Japanese pretender to the imperial throne (b. 1889)
 Jud Larson, American racecar driver (b. 1923)

12 
Thomas Hardie Chalmers, American opera singer, actor, and filmmaker (b. 1884).
 William Ernest Hocking, American philosopher (b. 1873)
Hermann Scherchen, Austrian conductor (b. 1891), heart attack.

13 
 Pierre Chaumié, French politician, member of the French Senate (b. 1880)
 John K. Hodnette, American engineer (b. 1902)
 Henry Hogbin, British politician, MP (b. 1880)

14 
 Walther Bacmeister, German jurist and ornithologist (b. 1873)
 Cub Buck, American football player and coach and college athletics administrator (b. 1892)
 Parnaoz Chikviladze, Soviet judoka, bronze medalist at the 1964 Summer Olympics (b. 1941)
 Henny Dons, Norwegian educator and missionary (b. 1874)

15 
 Robert G. Fowler, American aviation pioneer (b. 1884)
 Israel Kleiner, American biochemist (b. 1885)

16 
 Dantès Bellegarde, Haitian diplomat (b. 1877)
 Lew Brice, American dancer and comedian (b. 1893)
 Gen. Georg Keppler, German SS officer during World War II (b. 1894)

17 
 Betty Baxter Anderson, American author (b. 1908)
 Hans Christern, German officer during World War II (b. 1900)
 Luby DiMeolo, American football player and coach (b. 1903)
 Fern Majeau, Canadian ice hockey player (b. 1916)

18 
 German Galynin, Soviet composer (b. 1922)
 Konrad Heiden, German-born American journalist and historian (b. 1901)

19 
 Sydney Allard, British racing motorist and founder of the Allard car company (b. 1910)
 Chalmers Clifton, American conductor and composer (b. 1889)
 Marjan Kozina, Slovene composer (b. 1907)
 Ed Wynn, American actor (b. 1886)

20 
 Capt. Sir Malcolm Bullock, 1st Baronet, British soldier, politician, and nobleman, MP (b. 1890)
 Wilhelm Busch, German pastor and anti-Nazi (b. 1897)
 Cheng Bugao, Chinese film director (b. 1898) 
 Robert Hense, German footballer (b. 1885)
 John Hubbard, 3rd Baron Addington, British aristocrat (b. 1883)
 Paul Kuhn, German-born American opera singer (b. 1874)
 Louis-Joseph Lebret, French priest and ethicist (b. 1897)
 Georges Lemaître, Belgian priest and astrophysicist (b. 1894)

21 
 Reginald Calvert, British pirate radio station operator (b. 1928)
 Ferdinando Innocenti, Italian businessman (b. 1891)

22 
 Roger Blunt, English-born New Zealand cricketer (b. 1900)
 E. Yale Dawson, American botanist (b. 1918)
 Warren S. Eaton, American aviation pioneer (b. 1891)
 Victor Koumorico, Congolese politician, President of the Senate

23 
 Paul Cain, American author (b. 1902)
 Ted Corday, Canadian-born American television executive (b. 1908)
 Louis C. Cramton, American politician, United States Representative from Michigan (b. 1875)
 Frank L. Hagaman, American politician, Governor of Kansas (b. 1894)
 Weli Hohenthal, Russian modern pentathlete, competed at the 1912 Summer Olympics (b. 1880)
 Clara Jacobo, Italian opera singer (b. c. 1898)

24 
 Edward Allworth, American officer in the United States Army during World War I (Medal of Honor) (b. 1895)
 Eric Crankshaw, English cricketer and later Secretary, Government Hospitality Fund (b. 1885)
 Mick Dunn, Australian rules footballer (b. 1898)
 Otto-Wilhelm Förster, German general during World War II (b. 1885)
 J.K. Kennedy, American basketball coach (b. 1907)
 Mathilde Ludendorff, German psychiatrist and conspiracy theorist (b. 1877)

25 
 Ughetto Bertucci, Italian actor (b. 1907)
 F. Henri Klickmann, American composer (b. 1885)
 Hans Ferdinand Geisler, German Luftwaffe general during World War II (b. 1891)
 Busher Jackson, Canadian ice hockey player (b. 1911)
 F. Henri Klickmann, American composer (b. 1885)
 Wilf Loughlin, Canadian ice hockey player (b. 1896)
 Muriel Lowe, English cricketer (b. 1914)
 Edmund Sebree, American army general (b. 1898)

26 
 François Dupré, French hotelier, art collector, racehorse owner/breeder (b. 1888)
 George King, English film director (b. 1899)

27 
 John Davenport, English book reviewer and critic (b. 1908)
 Marty Krug, German-born American baseball player (b. 1888)

28 
 Kenneth Miller Adams, American artist (b. 1897)
 Gleason Archer, Sr., founder and first president of Suffolk University and Suffolk Law School in Boston, Massachusetts (b. 1880)
 Frances Maule Bjorkman, American suffragist (b. 1879)
 Mehmet Fuat Köprülü, Turkish politician, Minister of Foreign Affairs (b. 1890)

29 
 Lewis Bedford, English footballer (b. 1899)
 Gustav Kampendonk, German screenwriter (b. 1909)
 Damodar Dharmananda Kosambi, Indian mathematician and historian (b. 1907)

30 
 Margery Allingham, English writer of detective fiction (b. 1904)
 Loretta Bayliss, New Zealand cricketer (b. 1939)
 Mordaunt Doll, English cricketer (b. 1888)
 Giuseppe Farina, Italian race car driver (b. 1906)
 Ernest Fawcus, English cricketer (b. 1895)
 E. B. C. Jones, British writer (b. 1893)
 Jake Josvanger, Canadian politician, member of the Legislative Assembly of Alberta (b. 1908)
 Donald Russell Long, American soldier, awarded the Medal of Honor (b. 1939)

References

1966-06
June 1966 events